Douglas Ricardo Grolli (born 5 October 1989), known as Douglas Grolli, is a Brazilian professional footballer who plays as a central defender for Avispa Fukuoka.

Career
Grolli was born in São Miguel do Oeste, Santa Catarina, and was a Chapecoense youth graduate. Promoted to the first team in 2008, he only became a regular starter during the 2011 season, as his side was crowned champions of Campeonato Catarinense.

On 14 October 2011, Grolli signed for Série A club Grêmio. A fourth choice behind Werley, Vilson and Naldo, he made his debut in the category on 17 June 2012, coming on as a first-half substitute for the former in a 0–1 away loss against Náutico; he was also sent off during the match.

On 13 May 2013, Grolli was loaned to São Caetano until the end of the year. On 27 December, he moved to Londrina also in a temporary deal, but after appearing sparingly, he returned to Chapecoense the following 30 July, on loan until December.

On 9 February 2015, Grolli signed a permanent deal with Cruzeiro. Again rarely used, he served subsequent loans at Ponte Preta and Chapecoense.

On 4 January 2019, Grolli signed a contract with Marítimo.

Career statistics

Honours
Chapecoense
Campeonato Catarinense: 2011, 2017

Londrina
Campeonato Paranaense: 2014

References

External links

1989 births
Living people
Sportspeople from Santa Catarina (state)
Brazilian footballers
Brazilian expatriate footballers
Association football central defenders
Campeonato Brasileiro Série A players
Campeonato Brasileiro Série B players
Campeonato Brasileiro Série C players
Primeira Liga players
J2 League players
Associação Chapecoense de Futebol players
Grêmio Foot-Ball Porto Alegrense players
Associação Desportiva São Caetano players
Londrina Esporte Clube players
Cruzeiro Esporte Clube players
Associação Atlética Ponte Preta players
Esporte Clube Bahia players
C.S. Marítimo players
Avispa Fukuoka players
Brazilian expatriate sportspeople in Portugal
Brazilian expatriate sportspeople in Japan
Expatriate footballers in Portugal
Expatriate footballers in Japan